Terje Torberg Vevik Bratberg (born 17 January 1955) is a Norwegian historian and encyclopedist. He got his cand.philol. degree with his thesis on Jens Bjelke in 1990. Bratberg is the editor of the Norwegian language-encyclopedia on the city Trondheim, named Trondheim byleksikon.

Works
Munkholmen, editor with Øivind Lunde and Jill Løhre, 2008
Gårds- og slektshistorie for Rissa, 2007
Austrått : herregård i tusen år, 2006
Trondheim byleksikon, numerous editions
Utviklingen av et norsk storgods på 1660-tallet : Jens Bjelkes gods 1610-1665, main thesis in history, 1990
 Harald Nissen og Terje Bratberg: Schønings våpenbok – Gamle Norske Adel Efter et gammelt Manuskript Assessor Ifver Hirtzholm tilhørende, Pirforlaget, Trondheim 2013

References

1955 births
20th-century Norwegian historians
Writers from Trondheim
Living people
Norwegian encyclopedists
21st-century Norwegian historians